Madan-e Namak or Madan Namak may refer to:
 Madan Namak, Khuzestan